The meridian 162° east of Greenwich is a line of longitude that extends from the North Pole across the Arctic Ocean, Asia, the Pacific Ocean, the Southern Ocean, and Antarctica to the South Pole.

The 162nd meridian east forms a great circle with the 18th meridian west.

From Pole to Pole
Starting at the North Pole and heading south to the South Pole, the 162nd meridian east passes through:

{| class="wikitable plainrowheaders"
! scope="col" width="130" | Co-ordinates
! scope="col" | Country, territory or sea
! scope="col" | Notes
|-
| style="background:#b0e0e6;" | 
! scope="row" style="background:#b0e0e6;" | Arctic Ocean
| style="background:#b0e0e6;" |
|-valign="top"
| style="background:#b0e0e6;" | 
! scope="row" style="background:#b0e0e6;" | East Siberian Sea
| style="background:#b0e0e6;" | Passing between the Medvyezhi Islands, Sakha Republic,  (at )
|-valign="top"
| 
! scope="row" | 
| Sakha Republic Chukotka Autonomous Okrug — from  Magadan Oblast — from 
|-
| style="background:#b0e0e6;" | 
! scope="row" style="background:#b0e0e6;" | Sea of Okhotsk
| style="background:#b0e0e6;" | Penzhin Bay
|-
| 
! scope="row" | 
| Kamchatka Krai — Kamchatka Peninsula
|-
| style="background:#b0e0e6;" | 
! scope="row" style="background:#b0e0e6;" | Pacific Ocean
| style="background:#b0e0e6;" |
|-
| 
! scope="row" | 
| Kamchatka Krai — Kamchatka Peninsula
|-valign="top"
| style="background:#b0e0e6;" | 
! scope="row" style="background:#b0e0e6;" | Pacific Ocean
| style="background:#b0e0e6;" | Passing just west of Enewetak atoll,  (at ) Passing just east of the island of Ulawa,  (at ) Passing just east of the island of Malaupaina,  (at )
|-
| 
! scope="row" | 
| Island of Makira
|-
| style="background:#b0e0e6;" | 
! scope="row" style="background:#b0e0e6;" | Coral Sea
| style="background:#b0e0e6;" | 
|-
| style="background:#b0e0e6;" | 
! scope="row" style="background:#b0e0e6;" | Pacific Ocean
| style="background:#b0e0e6;" |
|-valign="top"
| style="background:#b0e0e6;" | 
! scope="row" style="background:#b0e0e6;" | Southern Ocean
|-
| 
! scope="row" | Antarctica
| Ross Dependency, claimed by 
|-
|}

See also
161st meridian east
163rd meridian east

e162 meridian east